Solariella zacalles is a species of sea snail, a marine gastropod mollusk in the family Solariellidae.

Description
The height of the shell attains 4 mm, its diameter 9 mm. The solid shell has a depressed conical shape and is deeply umbilicate. It contains six whorls. The oblique aperture is almost round and has a thin lip.

Distribution
This marine species in the Gulf of Oman and in the Persian Gulf.

References

 Trew, A., 1984. The Melvill-Tomlin Collection. Part 30. Trochacea. Handlists of the Molluscan Collections in the Department of Zoology, National Museum of Wales.

zacalles
Gastropods described in 1903